Z-polyhedron or Z-polytope may refer to:

The set of integer points in convex polyhedron
Convex lattice polytope